Kai Long Court is a Home Ownership Scheme (HOS) court developed by the Hong Kong Housing Authority and located at 18 Muk On Street, Kai Tak Development of Kowloon City District, Kowloon, Hong Kong. It commenced in March 2019.

The court has a site area of around 5,710 square metres, and comprises 3 residential blocks providing 683 residential units. A two-storey retail block will be constructed along the Station Square, with a short walking distance to MTR Kai Tak station.

The court was sold in March 2018 and had originally the highest-ever average HOS price of HK$9,755 per square foot in the HOS history. But later Carrie Lam, the Chief Executive of Hong Kong, decided to revise its price to HK$7,280 per square foot in average by ensuring at least 75% of flats, instead of the current 50%, were affordable.

Blocks

Nearby Buildings
Kai Tak station
One Kai Tak
Victoria Skye
De Novo
OASIS KAI TAK
Kai Ching Estate
Tak Long Estate
Richland Gardens
King Tai Court

References

Kai Tak Development
Home Ownership Scheme
Residential buildings completed in 2019